Gangwar is a sub-caste within the larger Kurmi caste of northern India.

Traditionally, it is a farming community and has its members in the districts of Bareilly and Pilibhit in Uttar Pradesh.

Notes

References

Social groups of Uttar Pradesh